Labská Stráň is a municipality and village in Děčín District in the Ústí nad Labem Region of the Czech Republic. It has about 200 inhabitants.

Sights
Belvedér viewing point is located in the municipality.

References

Villages in Děčín District
Bohemian Switzerland